Proxima Centauri b (or Proxima b), sometimes referred to as Alpha Centauri Cb, is an exoplanet orbiting within the habitable zone of the red dwarf star Proxima Centauri, which is the closest star to the Sun and part of the triple star system Alpha Centauri.

Its other properties are only poorly understood, but it is believed to be a potentially Earth-like planet with a minimum mass of at least  and only a slightly larger radius than that of Earth. The planet orbits within the habitable zone of its star; but it is not known whether it has an atmosphere. Proxima Centauri is a flare star with intense emission of electromagnetic radiation that could strip an atmosphere off the planet. The planet's proximity to Earth offers an opportunity for robotic space exploration, for example, with the Breakthrough Starshot project.

Announced on 24 August 2016 by the European Southern Observatory (ESO), Proxima Centauri b was confirmed via several years of using the method of studying the radial velocity of its parent star. Furthermore, the discovery of Proxima Centauri b, a planet at habitable distances from the closest star to the Solar System, was a major discovery in planetology and has drawn interest to the Alpha Centauri star system that Proxima itself is a member of.

Discovery 

Proxima Centauri had become a target for exoplanet searches already before the discovery of Proxima Centauri b, but initial studies in 2008 and 2009 ruled out the existence of larger-than-Earth exoplanets in the habitable zone. Planets are very common around dwarf stars, with on average 1–2 planets per star, and about 20–40% of all red dwarfs have one in the habitable zone. Additionally, red dwarfs are by far the most common type of stars.

Before 2016, observations with instruments at the European Southern Observatory in Chile had identified anomalies in Proxima Centauri which could not be satisfactorily explained by flares or chromospheric activity of the star. This suggested that Proxima Centauri may be orbited by a planet. In January 2016, a team of astronomers launched the Pale Red Dot project to confirm this hypothetical planet's existence. On 24 August 2016, the team led by Anglada-Escudé proposed that a terrestrial exoplanet in the habitable zone of Proxima Centauri could explain these anomalies and announced Proxima Centauri b's discovery. In 2022, another planet named Proxima Centauri d, which orbits even closer to the star, was confirmed. Another planet candidate named Proxima Centauri c was reported in 2020, but its existence has since been disputed, while the claimed existence of a dust belt around Proxima Centauri remains unconfirmed.

Physical properties

Distance, orbital parameters and age
, it is unclear whether or not it has an eccentricity but Proxima Centauri b is unlikely to have any obliquity. The age of the planet is unknown; Proxima Centauri itself may have been captured by Alpha Centauri and thus not necessarily of the same age as the latter, which are about 5 billion years old. Proxima Centauri b is unlikely to have stable orbits for moons.

Mass, radius and composition
This makes it similar to Earth, but the radius of the planet is poorly known and hard to determine, and its mass borders on the cutoff between Earth-type and Neptune-type planets. Depending on the composition, Proxima Centauri b could either be a Mercury-like planet with a large core—which would require particular conditions early in the planet's history—to a very water-rich planet. Observations of the Fe–Si–Mg ratios of Proxima Centauri may allow a determination of the composition of the planet, since they are expected to roughly match the ratios of any planetary bodies in the Proxima Centauri system; various observations have found Solar System-like ratios of these elements.

Little is known about Proxima Centauri b —mainly its distance from the star and its orbital period—but a number of simulations of its properties have been done. A number of simulations and models have been created that assume Earth-like compositions and include predictions of the galactic environment, internal heat generation from radioactive decay and magnetic induction heating, planetary rotation, the effects of stellar radiation, the amount of volatile species the planet consists of and the changes of these parameters over time.

Proxima Centauri b likely developed under different conditions from Earth, with less water, stronger impacts and an overall faster development, assuming that it formed at its current distance from the star. Proxima Centauri b probably did not form at its current distance to Proxima Centauri, as the amount of material in the protoplanetary disk would be insufficient. Instead, it or fragments formed at larger distances and then migrated to the current orbit of Proxima Centauri b. Depending on the nature of the precursor material, it may be rich in volatiles. A number of different formation scenarios are possible, many of which depend on the existence of other planets around Proxima Centauri and which would result in different compositions.

Tidal locking

Proxima Centauri b is likely to be tidally locked to the host star, which for a 1:1 orbit would mean that the same side of the planet would always face Proxima Centauri. It is unclear whether or not habitable conditions can arise under such circumstances as a 1:1 tidal lock would lead to an extreme climate with only part of the planet habitable. 

However, the planet may not be tidally locked. If the eccentricity of Proxima Centauri b was higher than 0.1-0.06, it would tend to enter a Mercury-like 3:2 resonance or higher-order resonances such as 2:1. Additional planets around Proxima Centauri and interactions with Alpha Centauri could excite higher eccentricies. If the planet isn't symmetrical (triaxial), a capture into a non-tidally locked orbit would be possible even with low eccentricity. A non-locked orbit however would result in tidal heating of the planet's mantle, increasing volcanic activity and potentially shutting down a magnetic field-generating dynamo. The exact dynamics are strongly dependent on the internal structure of the planet and its evolution in response to tidal heating.

Host star 

Proxima b's parent star Proxima Centauri is a red dwarf, radiating only 0.005% of the amount of visible light that the Sun does and an average of about 0.17% of the Sun’s energy. Despite this low radiation Proxima b still receives due to its close orbit about 70% of infrared energy that the Earth receives from the Sun.

Proxima Centauri is part of a multiple star system, whose other members are Alpha Centauri A and Alpha Centauri B which form a binary star subsystem. The dynamics of the multiple star system could have caused Proxima Centauri b to move closer to its host star over its history. The detection of a planet around Alpha Centauri in 2012 is considered questionable. Despite its proximity to Earth, Proxima Centauri is too faint to be visible to the naked eye with the exception of an instance where a flare made it visible to the naked eye.

Surface conditions

Climate

Proxima Centauri b is located within the classical habitable zone of its star and receives about 65% of Earth's irradiation. Various factors, such as the orbital properties of Proxima Centauri b, the spectrum of radiation emitted by Proxima Centauri and the behaviour of clouds and hazes influence the climate of an atmosphere-bearing Proxima Centauri b. 

There are two likely scenarios for an atmosphere of Proxima Centauri b: in one case, the planet's water could have condensed and the hydrogen would have been lost to space, which would have only left oxygen and/or carbon dioxide in the atmosphere after the planet's early history. However, it is also possible that Proxima Centauri b had a primordial hydrogen atmosphere or formed farther away from its star, which would have reduced the escape of water. Thus, Proxima Centauri b may have kept its water beyond its early history. If an atmosphere exists, it is likely to contain oxygen-bearing gases such as oxygen and carbon dioxide. Together with the star's magnetic activity, they would give rise to aurorae that could be observed from Earth if the planet has a magnetic field.

Climate models including general circulation models used for Earth climate have been used to simulate the properties of Proxima Centauri b's atmosphere. Depending on its properties such as whether it is tidally locked, the amount of water and carbon dioxide a number of scenarios are possible: A planet partially or wholly covered with ice, planet-wide or small oceans or only dry land, combinations between these or scenarios with one or two "eyeballs" or lobster-shaped areas with liquid water. Additional factors are:
 The nature of convection. 
 The distribution of continents, which can sustain a carbonate-silicate cycle and thus stabilize the atmospheric carbon dioxide concentrations. 
 Ocean heat transport which broadens the space for habitable climates.
 Ocean salinity variations that alter the properties of an ocean. 
 The rotational period of the planet which determines Rossby wave dynamics.
 Sea ice dynamics which could cause a global ocean to freeze over.

Stability of an atmosphere 

The stability of an atmosphere is a major issue for the habitability of Proxima Centauri b:
 Strong irradiation by UV radiation and X-rays from Proxima Centauri constitutes a challenge to habitability. Proxima Centauri b receives about 10–60 times as much of this radiation especially X-rays, as Earth. It might have received even more in the past, adding up to 7–16 times as much cumulative XUV radiation than Earth. UV radiation and X-rays can effectively evaporate an atmosphere since hydrogen readily absorbs the radiation and does not readily lose it again, thus warming until the speed of hydrogen atoms and molecules is sufficient to escape from the gravitational field of a planet. They can remove water by splitting it into hydrogen and oxygen and heating the hydrogen in the planet's exosphere until it escapes. The hydrogen can drag other elements such as oxygen and nitrogen away. Nitrogen and carbon dioxide can escape on their own from an atmosphere but this process is unlikely to substantially reduce the nitrogen and carbon dioxide content of an Earth-like planet.
 Stellar winds and coronal mass ejections are an even bigger threat to an atmosphere. The amount of stellar wind impacting Proxima Centauri b may amount to 4–80 times that impacting Earth. The more intense UV and X-rays radiation could lift the planet's atmosphere to outside of the magnetic field, increasing the loss triggered by stellar wind and mass ejections.
 At Proxima Centauri b's distance from the star, the stellar wind is likely to be denser than around Earth by a factor of 10–1000 depending on the strength of Proxima Centauri's magnetic field.  it is unknown whether the planet has a magnetic field and the upper atmosphere may have its own magnetic field. Depending on the intensity of Proxima Centauri b's magnetic field, it can penetrate deep into the atmosphere of the planet and strip parts of it off, with substantial variability over daily and annual timescales.
 If the planet is tidally locked to the star, the atmosphere can collapse on the night side. This is particularly a risk for a carbon dioxide-dominated atmosphere although carbon dioxide glaciers could recycle.
 Unlike Sun-like stars, Proxima Centauri's habitable zone would have been farther away early in the system's existence when the star was in its pre-main sequence stage. In the case of Proxima Centauri, assuming that the planet formed in its current orbit it could have spent up to 180 million years too close to its star for water to condense. Proxima Centauri b may therefore have suffered a runaway greenhouse effect, in which the planet's water would have evaporated into steam, which would then have been split into hydrogen and oxygen by UV radiation. The hydrogen and thus any water would have subsequently been lost, similar to what is believed to have happened to Venus.
 While the characteristics of impact events on Proxima Centauri b are currently entirely conjectural, they could destabilize the atmospheres and boil off oceans.

Even if Proxima Centauri b lost its original atmosphere, volcanic activity could rebuild it after some time. A second atmosphere would likely contain carbon dioxide, which would form a more stable atmosphere than an Earth-like atmosphere. In the case of Earth, the amount of water contained within the mantle might approach that of one Earth ocean. Additionally, impacts of exocomets could resupply water to Proxima Centauri b, if they are present.

Delivery of water to Proxima Centauri b

A number of mechanisms can deliver water to a developing planet; how much water Proxima Centauri b received is unknown. Modelling by Ribas et al. 2016 indicates that Proxima Centauri b would have lost no more than one Earth ocean equivalent of water but later research suggested that the amount of water lost could be considerably larger and Airapetian et al. 2017 concluded that an atmosphere would be lost within ten million years. The estimates are strongly dependent on the initial mass of the atmosphere, however, and are thus highly uncertain.

Life 

In the context of exoplanet research, "habitability" is usually defined as the possibility that liquid water exists on the surface of a planet. As normally understood in the context of exoplanet life, liquid water on the surface and an atmosphere are prerequisites for habitability—any life limited to the sub-surface of a planet, such as in a subsurface ocean like in Europa in the Solar System, would be difficult to detect from afar although it may constitute a model for life in a cold ocean-covered Proxima Centauri b.

Possible setbacks to habitability 
The habitability of red dwarfs is a controversial subject, with a number of considerations:
 Both the activity of Proxima Centauri and tidal locking would hinder the establishment of these conditions. 
 Unlike XUV radiation, UV radiation on Proxima Centauri b is redder (colder) and thus may interact less with organic compounds and may produce less ozone. Conversely, stellar activity could deplete an ozone layer sufficiently to increase UV radiation to dangerous levels. 
 Depending on its eccentricity, it may partially lie outside of the habitable zone during part of its orbit. 
 Oxygen and/or carbon monoxide may build up in the atmosphere of Proxima Centauri b to toxic quantities. High oxygen concentrations may however aid in the evolution of complex organisms.
 If oceans are present, the tides could lead to the flooding and drying of coastal landscapes, triggering chemical reactions conducive to the development of life, favour the evolution of biological rhythms such as the day-night cycle which otherwise would not develop in a tidally locked planet without a day-night cycle, mix oceans and supply and redistribute nutrients and stimulate periodic expansions of marine organisms such as red tides on Earth.

On the other hand, red dwarfs like Proxima Centauri have a lifespan much longer than the Sun, up to many times the estimated age of the Universe, and thus give life plenty of time to develop. The radiation emitted by Proxima Centauri is ill-suited for oxygen-generating photosynthesis but sufficient for anoxygenic photosynthesis although it is unclear how life depending on anoxygenic photosynthesis could be detected. One study in 2017 estimated that the productivity of a Proxima Centauri b ecosystem based on photosynthesis may be about 20% that of Earth's.

Observation and exploration 

, Proxima Centauri b has not yet been directly imaged, as its separation from Proxima Centauri is too small for that. It is unlikely to transit Proxima Centauri from Earth's perspective; all surveys have failed to find evidence for any transits of Proxima Centauri b. The star is monitored for the possible emission of technology-related radio signals by the Breakthrough Listen project which in April–May 2019 detected the BLC1 signal; later investigations however indicated it is probably of human origin.

Future large ground-based telescopes and space-based observatories such as the James Webb Space Telescope and the Nancy Grace Roman Space Telescope could directly observe Proxima Centauri b, given its proximity to Earth, but disentangling the planet from its star would be difficult. Possible traits observable from Earth are the reflection of starlight from an ocean, the radiative patterns of atmospheric gases and hazes and of atmospheric heat transport. Efforts have been done to determine what Proxima Centauri b would look like to Earth if it has particular properties such as atmospheres of a particular composition.

Even the fastest spacecraft built by humans would take a long time to travel interstellar distances; Voyager 2 would take about 75,000 years to reach Proxima Centauri. Among the proposed technologies to reach Proxima Centauri b in human lifespans are solar sails that could reach speeds of 20% the speed of light; problems would be how to decelerate a probe when it arrives in the Proxima Centauri system and collisions of the high-speed probes with interstellar particles. Among the projects of travelling to Proxima Centauri b are the Breakthrough Starshot project, which aims to develop instruments and power systems that can reach Proxima Centauri in the 21st century.

View from Proxima Centauri b 

From Proxima Centauri b, the binary stars Alpha Centauri would be considerably brighter than Venus is from Earth, with an apparent magnitude of −6.8 and −5.2 respectively. The Sun would appear as a bright star with an apparent magnitude of 0.40 in the constellation of Cassiopeia. The brightness of the Sun would be similar to that of Achernar or Procyon from Earth.

View from Earth

Videos

See also

 Alpha Centauri Bb – exoplanet once proposed to be orbiting the secondary star of the system, Alpha Centauri B, and was dubbed the closest exoplanet for a while before being disproven
 Astrobiology
 Extremely large telescope
 Exoplanet orbital and physical parameters
 List of potentially habitable exoplanets

Notes

References

Sources

Further reading

External links 

 A search for Earth-like planets around Proxima Centauri
 The habitability of Proxima Centauri b – Pale Red Dot website for future updates
 
 
 

Centaurus (constellation)
Exoplanets detected by radial velocity
Exoplanets discovered in 2016
Near-Earth-sized exoplanets in the habitable zone
Proxima Centauri